Robotron X is a multidirectional shooter video game released by Midway Games in November 1996 for the PlayStation. It is a 3D version of the 1982 dual-stick shooter Robotron: 2084. GT Interactive published a Microsoft Windows port in 1997. A Nintendo 64 version was released in 1998 as Robotron 64.

Gameplay

In addition to the graphical update, the game includes new audio and multiple camera angles.

Reception
While the game features similar gameplay as the original, it was not as well-received, though reviews for it ranged from mixed to positive. Authors Andrew Rollings and Ernest Adams considered the moving camera in the 3D environment a negative update. They felt the original format—an overhead perspective of a single screen—presented the player with all the necessary information and relied on the player's skill. The moving camera angle, however, obscured areas of the playing field and could result in the player being shot by an enemy that suddenly appeared. Some critics cited this as the game's one major flaw. Vince echoed similar statements, stating that the gameplay suffered from the loss of important aspects from the original. Rollings and Adams, however, attribute the fad of classic video game remakes in the late 1990s in part to Robotron Xs release, though at the time of that release it was believed this fad was already in place.

Next Generation reviewed the PlayStation version of the game, rating it three stars out of five.

Aaron Curtiss for the Los Angeles Times wrote that "For fans of the original, this one is better--although the original is still available on Williams’ Arcade’s Greatest Hits. For newcomers, Robotron X is the kind of game the critics decry as mindless. But it sure is fun."

Reviews
GameFan #49 (Vol 5, Issue 1) - January 1997
NowGamer - Mar 01, 1997
PC Zone - Aug 13, 2001
GameSpot - Dec 01, 1996

References

External links
 Review at Tripoint
 Review at GameSpot

1996 video games
GT Interactive games
PlayStation (console) games
Twin-stick shooters
Video game sequels
Video games developed in the United States
Video games scored by Aubrey Hodges
Windows games